The Cameraman's Revenge is a 1912 Russian short film written and directed by Ladislas Starevich. It, along with other works by Starevich, stands out in the history of stop-motion animation for its use of actual dried insect specimens (beetles, grasshoppers, dragonflies, etc.) as articulated stop-motion puppets portraying all of the characters.

Plot 
The film is based on the love collision of the Zhukov family (deer beetles), the artist Usachini (beetle-beetle), the grasshopper cameraman and the dancing dragonfly.

References

External links 
 

1912 films
1910s animated short films
1910s stop-motion animated films
Stop-motion animated short films
1910s Russian-language films
Films directed by Ladislas Starevich
Russian silent short films
Russian black-and-white films
Films of the Russian Empire
1912 short films
1912 animated films